"Dreaming" is a song by British R&B group MN8. It was released in October 1996 from their second album, Freaky. It peaked at number 21 on the UK Singles Chart.

Critical reception
British magazine Music Week rated "Dreaming" three out of five. The reviewer added, "MN8 go all soppy for this soulful ballad from the forthcoming album, their seventh single and slowest to date."

Track listings
 CD 1
 "Dreaming" (Radio Version) — 3:35
 "Dreaming" (Album Version) — 5:09
 "Dreaming" (Acappella Version) — 4:42
 "[Dreaming] 'Bout U" — 4:03

 CD 2
 "Dreaming" (Radio Version) — 3:35
 "Dreaming" (C-Swing Soul Mix) — 5:36
 "The Player" — 4:29
 "Tuff Act To Follow" (Torins Act Up Mix) — 8:54

 Cassette single
 "Dreaming" (Radio Version) — 3:35
 "[Dreaming] 'Bout U" — 4:03

Charts

References

1996 singles
MN8 songs
Songs written by Terry Britten
Songs written by Graham Lyle
1996 songs